Sapsucker is the fourth and final studio album by the Walking Timebombs, released in 2001 by Anomie Records.

Track listing

Personnel 
Adapted from the Sapsucker liner notes.

Walking Timebombs
 Scott Ayers – guitar, electronics, sampler, tape, production, mastering
 Sarah Evans – vocals
 Frank Garymartin – drums
 Charlie Sanders Jr. – bass guitar

Production and additional personnel
 Mike Schneider – mastering, photography
 Tim Thomson – design

Release history

References

External links 
 Sapsucker at Discogs (list of releases)

2001 albums
Walking Timebombs albums
Albums produced by Scott Ayers